Progressive Democratic Front is a political front in the Indian state of Kerala. It was founded in April 2004 and consisted of the National Janata Party, Janata Dal (United), Rashtriya Janata Dal, Samajwadi Party and Secular National Dravida Party None of these parties carry any significant weight in Kerala.

Political parties in Kerala
2004 establishments in Kerala
Political parties established in 2004